Joe Vogel (born January 4, 1997) is an American politician who is a member of the Maryland House of Delegates in District 17. He is the first Uruguayan-American elected to a state legislature in the United States.

Background 
Vogel's family immigrated from Uruguay when he was three years old.  He became a citizen in November 2016. He graduated from Charles E. Smith Jewish Day School and attended George Washington University, where he earned his bachelor's degree. During his time at GWU, Vogel was a member of the student senate, but was impeached and removed from the senate in January 2018 for missing four consecutive meetings due to his involvement with then-Virginia lieutenant governor Ralph Northam's gubernatorial campaign. From 2020 to 2022, Vogel attended Harvard University, where he received a master's in public policy at the Harvard Kennedy School.

Vogel developed an interest in politics while in school, where he had been active in student government. He volunteered on Barack Obama's 2012 campaign when he was 15 years old, and later worked on the 2014 campaign of then-state senate candidate Cheryl Kagan. In 2016, Vogel took a year off college at George Washington University to work for the presidential campaign of Hillary Clinton. In 2018, he began working for New Jersey Senator Cory Booker and later worked on the 2020 presidential campaign of Cory Booker.

Vogel previously worked as a policy fellow at Montgomery County's Interfaith Works and started his own non-profit during the COVID-19 pandemic to help students of essential workers as they transitioned to remote learning.

In September 2021, Vogel announced his candidacy for the Maryland House of Delegates in District 17, seeking to succeed outgoing state delegate James W. Gilchrist. During the primary, Vogel strategized with Connecticut state senator Will Haskell and hosted campaign events featuring Cory Booker. He also received endorsements from state senator Cheryl Kagan, the Maryland Sierra Club, CASA in Action, and various local labor unions including SEIU and AFSCME. Vogel's campaign also did not accept contributions from corporate PACs or corporate lobbyists. He won the Democratic primary on July 19, 2022, with 27.9 percent of the vote, and defeated Republicans Helen Meister and Donald Patti in the general election with 27.5 percent of the vote. After winning the Democratic primary, Vogel dedicated his time to engaging volunteers and canvassing for other Democratic candidates including U.S. Representative David Trone.

In the legislature 
Vogel was sworn into the Maryland House of Delegates on January 11, 2023. He is the youngest member of the legislature and, alongside Jeffrie Long Jr., the first Gen-Z member of the Maryland General Assembly. He is a member of the House Ways and Means Committee.

Personal life 
Vogel is openly gay. He is Jewish, and lives in Rockville, Maryland. He is trilingual, speaking English, Spanish, and Hebrew.

Political positions 
During his House of Delegates campaign, Vogel ran on a platform that included climate, mental health, and economic issues.

Education 
During the 2023 legislative session, Vogel introduced a bill to forgive up to $30,000 in student debt for mental health professionals employed at Maryland public schools.

Israel 
While at GWU, Vogel described himself as an "outspoken supporter of Israel".

Social issues 
During the 2023 legislative session, Vogel introduced a bill to establish a commission on hate crime response and prevention following an uptick in hateful acts in Montgomery County. He also introduced the Event-Goer Rights and Accountable Sales (ERAS) Act, requiring ticket issuers to enforce a ticket refund policy and ban restrictions on ticket resales and transfers.

Taxes 
During the 2023 legislative session, Vogel introduced a bill to provide tax credits to Maryland-based news media outlets with fewer than 50 employees for advertising costs.

Electoral history

References

External links
 

21st-century American politicians
1997 births
American people of Uruguayan-Jewish descent
American Zionists
Democratic Party members of the Maryland House of Delegates
Gay politicians
George Washington University alumni
LGBT Jews
LGBT people from Maryland
LGBT state legislators in Maryland
Living people
Uruguayan emigrants to the United States
Uruguayan Jews
People from Rockville, Maryland
Naturalized citizens of the United States
Harvard University alumni
Jewish American politicians
American people of Uruguayan descent
People from Montevideo